La Tapoa Airport  is an airport serving La Tapoa in Niger.

References

Airports in Niger